The Lively Set is a 1964 American color action drama sport film directed by Jack Arnold and starring James Darren, Pamela Tiffin, Doug McClure and Joanie Sommers.

Plot
Casey Owens, a young mechanic, has developed a design for a turbine car engine, paving the way for a jet-powered auto certain to set a new land speed record. Wealthy playboy Stanford Rogers hires Casey to build the car for him to race in the Tri-State Endurance Run. Chuck Manning, an engineering student whom Casey had met in a drag race, discovers potential flaws in the car's design. After an unsuccessful test run, Rogers abandons the turbine-powered car for a traditional racing model, but Casey and Chuck rework the turbine vehicle to compete with Rogers in the endurance run. Chuck's sister Eadie becomes Casey's love interest.

Cast
 James Darren as Casey Owens
 Pamela Tiffin as Eadie Manning
 Doug McClure as Chuck Manning
 Joanie Sommers as Doreen Grey
 Marilyn Maxwell as Marge Owens
 Charles Drake as Paul Manning
 Peter Mann as Stanford Rogers 
 Carole Wells as Mona
 Frances Robinson as Celeste Manning
 Greg Morris as Highway Patrol Officer 
 Ross Elliott as Ernie Owens
 Russ Conway as Dave Moody 
 Martin Blaine as Prof. George E. Collins
 Max Schumacher as Himself (as Captain Max Schumancher)
 Dick Whittinghill as Himself
 Mickey Thompson as Himself
 James Nelson as Himself
 Duane Carter as Himself 
 Billy Krause as Himself
 Ron Miller as Himself
 Dave MacDonald as Himself

Production
Filming started in January 1964.

Bobby Darin was hired to write three songs for the film, but Universal was so pleased with the results that they enlisted him to write the entire score.

The film's release, originally set for July 1964, was delayed until October, and the film was heavily edited out of respect for Dave MacDonald, who played himself and was a stunt driver in the film.  MacDonald died on May 30, 1964 during the Indianapolis 500 in a fiery crash that also killed Eddie Sachs, who had also been in some scenes, during the second lap. Scenes featuring Sachs and all but one scene featuring MacDonald were removed from the film, and neither driver's name appears in the on-screen credits.  Years later, son Rich MacDonald contacted James Darren in order to put his father's name in the Internet Movie Database (IMDB).  Chrysler mechanic George Stecher appeared in reshot scenes that had originally featured MacDonald.

The turbine car
The turbine car used in the film is the famous 1963 Chrysler Ghia Turbine Car developed by George Huebner and his team. The car's engine is realistically described in the film, particularly Chrysler's use of heat regenerators, which cooled the car's exhaust to a temperature even lower than that of a traditional piston engine.

The Chrysler Turbine Car is mentioned in the opening credits of the film. Chrysler participated in the film's development as the car was its exclusive property and the patented engine design was extensively advertised as the "engine of the future."

Reception
The Los Angeles Times called the film "... the most awful little time waster."

Writing in The New York Times, critic Eugene Arthur wrote, "By the fadeout, everyone up there on the screen is positively beaming with joy. Before congratulating them on their acting ability, though, remember that they, unlike the helpless customers, were paid."

Awards
The Lively Set was nominated at the 37th Academy Awards for Best Sound Editing (Robert Bratton).

References

External links

1964 films
1960s action films
1960s sports films
American auto racing films
American road movies
1960s English-language films
Films directed by Jack Arnold
Universal Pictures films
1960s American films